Luigi Magnotti (23 April 1895 – 8 July 1948) was an Italian cyclist. He competed in two events at the 1924 Summer Olympics.

References

External links
 

1895 births
1948 deaths
Italian male cyclists
Olympic cyclists of Italy
Cyclists at the 1924 Summer Olympics
Cyclists from the Metropolitan City of Milan